John Charles Terelak (born 1942) is an American Impressionist artist known for painting scenes of New England.

Personal life 
John Terelak was born in 1942 in Boston, Massachusetts, and entered the Vesper George School of Art in 1960, becoming an instructor there after graduating. In 1975 he founded Gloucester Academy of Fine Art. He was a president of the New England Watercolor Society.

Collections 
His paintings are included in collections including: the Andrew Mellon Foundation, Sheraton Corporation, Winthrop Financial Corporation, Prudential Insurance Company, Bank of Boston, Shawmut Bank, State Street Bank, Boston, and the Sterling-Regal Publishing Company.

His works have been included in exhibitions at The National Academy of Design, The Museum of Fine Arts, Boston, The Springfield Museum, and The Butler Museum, among others.

References

External links
Terelak.com (official site)
"John Terelak", The Guild of Boston Artists capsule biography

American artists
1942 births
Living people